La Nya or Nya is one of six departments in Logone Oriental, a region of Chad. Its capital is Bébédjia.

Departments of Chad
Logone Oriental Region